General elections were held in Papua New Guinea between 13 and 27 June 1992. The result was a victory for the Pangu Party, which won 22 of the 109 seats. Voter turnout was 81.2%.

Results

References

External links
Centre on Democratic Performance Election Results Archive

Elections in Papua New Guinea
Papua
General
National Parliament of Papua New Guinea
Election and referendum articles with incomplete results